Wendy McElroy (born 1951) is a Canadian individualist feminist and voluntaryist   writer. She was a co-founder along with Carl Watner and George H. Smith of The Voluntaryist magazine in 1982 and is the author of a number of books. McElroy is the editor of the website ifeminists.net.

McElroy is the author of the book Rape Culture Hysteria, in which she contends that rape culture is a result of popular hysteria to the disadvantage of men, and in particular, white men.

In November 2014, McElroy was scheduled to debate Jessica Valenti at a Brown University Janus Forum debate on "How Should Colleges Handle Sexual Assault?". Before the debate, Brown President Christina Paxson sent out a campus-wide e-mail saying she disagreed with McElroy's views, and set up an alternative event at the same time to compete with the debate. The actions of Brown students and Paxson were criticized by various commentators.

Published works 
 Books
 National Identification Systems: Essays in Opposition, by Carl Watner, Wendy McElroy, 2004 
 Debates of Liberty: An Overview of Individualist Anarchism, 1881–1908, 2003 
 
 Sexual Correctness: The Gender-Feminist Attack on Women, 2001
 Dissenting Electorate: Those Who Refuse to Vote and the Legitimacy of Their Opposition by Carl Watner, Wendy McElroy, 2001
 Individualist Feminism of the Nineteenth Century: Collected Writings and Biographical Profiles, 2001
 Queen Silver: The Godless Girl (Women's Studies (Amherst, NY), Queen Selections Silver, 1999 – about her friend Queen Selections Silver.
 Freedom, Feminism, and the State by Wendy McElroy, Lewis Perry, 1999
 The Reasonable Woman: A Guide to Intellectual Survival, 1998
 XXX: A Woman's Right to Pornography Prelude Press, 1995, 
 Liberty, 1881–1908: A Comprehensive Index, 1982
 Articles

References

External links 

 Official Website
Appearances on C-SPAN

1951 births
Living people
20th-century Canadian non-fiction writers
20th-century Canadian women writers
21st-century Canadian non-fiction writers
21st-century Canadian women writers
Canadian feminist writers
Canadian libertarians
Canadian political writers
Canadian women non-fiction writers
Female critics of feminism
Feminist critics of feminism
Feminist studies scholars
Individualist feminists
Libertarian theorists
Non-interventionism
Sex-positive feminists
Voluntaryists
Mary Wollstonecraft scholars